Laplacian smoothing is an algorithm to smooth a polygonal mesh. For each vertex in a mesh, a new position is chosen based on local information (such as the position of neighbours) and the vertex is moved there. In the case that a mesh is topologically a rectangular grid (that is, each internal vertex is connected to four neighbours) then this operation produces the Laplacian of the mesh.

More formally, the smoothing operation may be described per-vertex as:

See also
Tutte embedding, an embedding of a planar mesh in which each vertex is already at the average of its neighbours' positions

References

Mesh generation
Geometry processing